The Thirteenth Texas Legislature met from January 14 to June 4, 1873 in its regular session. All members of the House of Representatives and about half of the members of the Senate were elected in 1872.

Sessions
13th Regular session: January 14–June 4, 1873

Party summary

Officers

Senate
 Lieutenant Governor Vacant
 President pro tempore (Lieutenant Governor ex officio)
 Edward Bradford Pickett, Democrat

House of Representatives
 Speaker of the House
 M. D. K. Taylor, Democrat

Members
Members of the Thirteenth Texas Legislature at the beginning of the Regular Session, January 14, 1873:

Senate

House of Representatives

C. L. Abbott
John Adriance
Richard Allen, Republican
Thomas G. Allison
Em Anderson
James Monroe Anderson
James Armstrong
Julius Berends
Samuel Bewley
W.S. Bledsoe
Augustus J. Booty
Richard Bordeaux
A. S. Broaddus
Bluford Brown
John Henry Brown
Edward Chambers
John Carroll
Gustave Cook
John Cunningham
Overton Fletcher Davenport
Samuel Day
Ashley Denton
Peter Diller
John N. Doyle
James Eastland
W. A. Ellett
Henry Ford
Louis Frankee
C.C. Galloway
Robert Gaston
Henry Clay Ghent, M.D. (Seventeenth District, including Bell and Milam Counties)]
Levi Gillette
Henry Addington Gilpin
William Greene
James Marshall Harrison
Thomas Hester
Gustav V. Hoffmann
Orlando Newton Hollingsworth
John Ireland
Thomas M. Joseph
Josiah Kemble
Ira Killough
Marcellus E. Kleberg
William Lane
Johann Frederic Leyendecker
Abner S. Lipscomb
William Mabry
Hilary Manning
John M. McDonald
F.A. Michael
J.S. Mills
Henry Moore
William Morris
Hudson Nelson
Julius Noeggerath
Jonathan Payne
Henry Phelps
Stephen Powers
Davis M. Prendergast
Frank Rainey
Burlington Wesley Rimes
Sam Robb
Meshack Roberts
David Decatur Rosborough
Alexander Rossey
Jonathan Russell
Chauncey B. Sabin
Charles Partin Salter
William Sayers
Erich F. Schmidt
Preston Scott
Edward Sharp
W.A. Shaw
Eli Shelton
Daniel Short
George Washington Smith
John T. Smith
Leonidas Jefferson Storey
Charles Stockbridge
Marion DeKalb Taylor
Alfred Sturgis Thurmond
William Tilson
Joseph Albert Tivy
John Files Tom
William H. Trolinger
Khleber Miller Van Zandt
William Veale
Stephen Venters
U.G. Mitchell Walker
James H. Washington
Arthur Thomas Watts
William Westfall
Allen W. Wilder
Richard Williams
Clinton McKamy Winkler
William Daniel Wood

 Representative Allen was apparently re-elected, but House Democrats alleged voting fraud and seated his Democratic opponent instead.

Membership Changes

References

External links

13 Texas Legislature
1873 in Texas
1873 U.S. legislative sessions